American Young is an American country music duo signed to Curb Records. The duo is composed of Kristy Osmunson, formerly of the group Bomshel, and songwriter/producer Jon Stone.

In late 2013, the duo released their debut single, "Love Is War", which has charted on Country Airplay. Billy Dukes of Taste of Country gave the song 4 out of 5 stars, comparing their sound favorably to The Civil Wars.

Discography

Studio albums

Extended plays

Singles

Music videos

Songs written by Jon Stone

Songs written by Kristy Osmunson

References

Country music groups from Tennessee
Country music duos
Curb Records artists
Musical groups established in 2013
Musical groups from Nashville, Tennessee
2013 establishments in Tennessee
American musical duos
Male–female musical duos